GVU may refer to:
 GVU (Utrecht), a defunct Dutch bus operator
 Gesellschaft zur Verfolgung von Urheberrechtsverletzungen e.V., a German entertainment industry copyright organization
 GVU Center at Georgia Tech